Blew is a surname. Notable people with the surname include:

 Horace Blew (1873–1957), Welsh footballer
 Russell Blew (born 1941), Australian Rules footballer
 William John Blew (1808–1894), English hymnist and translator

See also
 Blow (surname)